Blanquette may refer to:

A synonym for the name of various white grape varieties
In the southwest of France, alternatively Bourboulenc, Clairette, Graisse, Mauzac and Ondenc
In other parts of France, Colombard
In various European countries, Chasselas
In Australia, Clairette
Blanquette rouge, another name for the French wine grape Canari noir
Blanquette de Limoux, a French sparkling white wine
Blanquette de veau, a veal dish